Willie Ruane (born 10 August 1975) is a former professional rugby union player from Ireland who currently serves as chief executive officer of his former team Connacht Rugby. During his playing career he primarily played as a fullback.

Playing career
Ruane played club rugby for Galwegians, and provincial rugby for Connacht. He featured for Connacht in the Challenge Cup in the 1997–98 and 1998–99 seasons, playing in every one of Connacht's games in each season. Ruane retired from rugby at the age of 25 to take a job with Bank of Ireland.

During his career Ruane represented Ireland youth sides internationally, playing for the national sides at Colleges and under-21 level. He also played for the international invitational side the Barbarians.

Banking
After retiring from playing for Connacht, Ruane worked in a variety of roles in different banks in Ireland, including Bank of Ireland, Anglo Irish Bank and Ulster Bank.

Rugby administration 
In 2014, Ruane took up his current role as CEO of Connacht Rugby.

Personal life
Ruane was born in County Mayo. He was a pupil at Garbally College in Ballinasloe and received a degree in Business Studies from Waterford IT. Ruane lives in his hometown of Ballina, and is married with three sons, Billy, Tom and Robert.

References

1975 births
Living people
Barbarian F.C. players
Connacht Rugby non-playing staff
Connacht Rugby players
Galwegians RFC players
Sportspeople from County Mayo
People from Ballina, County Mayo
People educated at Garbally College
Alumni of Waterford Institute of Technology
Rugby union fullbacks
Rugby union players from County Mayo